Geum geniculatum is a species of flowering plant in the rose family known by the common name bent avens. It is endemic to the southern Appalachian Mountains in the United States, where it occurs on only three mountains: Grandfather Mountain and Rich Mountain in North Carolina and Roan Mountain straddling the North Carolina-Tennessee border.

Geum geniculatum is a perennial herb growing 50 to 70 centimeters (20-28 inches) tall. The three-parted leaves are 1 to 1.5 centimeters (0.4-0.6 inches) long. The clustered flowers have white, pinkish, or greenish petals. Flowering occurs in July and August. The flowers are likely pollinated by bumblebees and honeybees.

This may be a relict species, limited in distribution to the peaks of three mountains where conditions are cool and wet enough for it to survive. It grows on moist boulder fields and streambanks. It often grows in shady conditions in a thick herb layer with rhododendrons and other plants.

There are only four known populations of this species, but where it grows it may be locally abundant.

References

External links
United States Department of Agriculture Plants Profile

geniculatum
Flora of North Carolina
Flora of Tennessee
Plants described in 1803